E3 ubiquitin-protein ligase ZNRF1 is an enzyme that in humans is encoded by the ZNRF1 gene.

In a study identifying genes in rat that are upregulated in response to nerve damage, a gene which is highly expressed in ganglia and in the central nervous system was found. The protein encoded by the rat gene contains both a zinc finger and a RING finger motif and is localized in the endosome/lysosome compartment, indicating that it may be involved in ubiquitin-mediated protein modification. The protein encoded by this human gene is highly similar in sequence to that encoded by the rat gene.

References

Further reading